The 1877 Philadelphia mayoral election saw the reelection of William S. Stokley to a third consecutive term.

Results

References

1877
Philadelphia
Philadelphia mayoral
19th century in Philadelphia